Werner Johannes Krauss (Krauß in German; 23 June 1884 – 20 October 1959) was a German stage and film actor. Krauss dominated the German stage of the early 20th century. However, his participation in the antisemitic propaganda film Jud Süß and his collaboration with the Nazis made him a controversial figure.

Early life
Krauss was born at the parsonage of Gestungshausen bei Sonnefeld in Upper Franconia, where his grandfather was a Protestant pastor. He spent his childhood in Breslau and from 1901 attended the teacher's college at Kreuzburg. After it became known that he worked as an extra at the Breslau Lobe-Theater, he was suspended from classes and decided to join a travelling theatre company.

Acting career

In 1903 he debuted at the Guben municipal theatre. Although never trained as an actor, he continued to play in Magdeburg, in Bromberg at the Theater Aachen, in Nuremberg and in Munich.

By the agency of Alexander Moissi, in 1913 he met the theatre director Max Reinhardt, who took Krauss to his Deutsches Theater in Berlin. However, Krauss initially only gained minor and secondary roles like King Claudius in Shakespeare's Hamlet or Mephistopheles in Goethe's Faust, wherefore after his military discharge as a midshipman of the Imperial German Navy in 1916 he also pursued a career as a film actor.

Krauss' first film role was in Richard Oswald's 1916 Tales of Hoffmann. Committed to playing sinister characters, he became a worldwide sensation for his demonic portrayal of the titular character in Robert Wiene's film The Cabinet of Dr. Caligari (1920), considered a milestone of German Expressionism. Krauss also played the title role of Shakespeare's Othello in a 1920 adaption, and played Iago in a 1922 film adaptation. He was prominently featured in Paul Leni's Waxworks (1924), F.W. Murnau's Tartuffe,  and The Student of Prague (1926).

In 1924 Krauss continued his theatre career by joining the ensemble of the Prussian State Theatre in Berlin. He again appeared on stage of the Deutsches Theater from 1926, as in Strindberg's A Dream Play filling five roles or as Wilhelm Voigt in the 1931 premiere of Carl Zuckmayer's The Captain of Köpenick. He also performed at the Vienna Burgtheater, and guest performances even brought him to London and on Broadway in New York City, where Max Reinhardt staged Karl Vollmöller's The Miracle in 1924.

Krauss' consummate skills in characterization earned him the title of "the man with a thousand faces". His fellow actress Elisabeth Bergner called him "the greatest actor of all time" and a "demonic genius" in her memoirs. Oskar Werner, born Oskar Josef Bschließmayer, chose his stage name in Krauss' honour.

Nazi Germany

Krauss was an unapologetic antisemite who supported the Nazi Party and its ideology. While the Nazis seized power in Berlin in January 1933, Krauss joined the Vienna Burgtheater ensemble to perform as Napoleon in 100 Tage (Campo di maggio), a drama written by Giovacchino Forzano together with Benito Mussolini, whereafter he was received by the Italian dictator and also made the acquaintance of Nazi Propaganda Minister Joseph Goebbels. In the course of the totalitarian Gleichschaltung process, Krauss was appointed Vice President of the Reichskulturkammer theatre department and served in that capacity from 1933 to 1935. In 1934, Krauss was designated as a Staatsschauspieler ('State Actor', i.e. an actor of national importance). Upon the death of Reich President Paul von Hindenburg in August, he signed the Aufruf der Kulturschaffenden to merge of the offices of President and Chancellor in the person of Adolf Hitler. Goebbels and Hitler rated Krauss as a cultural ambassador of Nazi Germany.

Krauss and Max Reinhardt worked together for the last time at the 1937 Salzburg Festival, staging Goethe's Faust (with Krauss as Mephistopheles) in the Felsenreitschule theatre, shortly before Reinhardt emigrated to the United States. In 1940, Krauss simultaneously played the roles of six stereotypical Jewish characters – among them Rabbi Loew and Sekretar Levy – in Veit Harlan's antisemitic propaganda film Jud Süß, implementing Harlan's concept of a common Jewish root. When asked by Wolfgang Liebeneiner about the devastating effects of his performance, he replied: "that's no concern of mine – I'm an actor!" Krauss also played Shylock in Lothar Müthel's defamatory production of The Merchant of Venice staged at the Burgtheater in 1943. In 1944, Krauss was added to the "Gottbegnadeten list" of indispensable German artists, which exempted him from military service in the Wehrmacht forces, including service on the home front.

Postwar
After the war, Krauss had to leave his home in Mondsee near Salzburg and was expelled from Austria. He also was banned from performing on stage and in films in Germany. His films were proscribed and he was ordered to undergo a denazification program from 1947 to 1948, whereafter he could return to Austria to become a naturalized citizen. In 1950, he again performed as King Lear at the Ruhr Festival in Recklinghausen. However, in December his performance with the Burgtheater ensemble at the Kurfürstendamm Theatre in Berlin met with protest.

In 1951 Krauss again received German citizenship. Ultimately, he was rehabilitated to the extent of being invited to German film festivals. In 1954, he received the Iffland-Ring, though not determined by the previous holder Albert Bassermann but by a committee of German-speaking actors. In the same year, Krauss was awarded the Order of the Federal Republic of Germany; in 1955, he received the High Decoration of the Republic of Austria. In 1958, Krauss published his autobiography titled Das Schauspiel meines Lebens (The Play of my Life).

Krauss died in relative obscurity in Vienna at the age of 75. He was cremated and buried in an Ehrengrab in the Vienna Zentralfriedhof.

Filmography 

 Die geheimnisvolle Villa (1914)
 Tales of Hoffmann (1916) as Conte Dapertutto
 Zirkusblut (1916) as Thomas the tramp
 Die vertauschte Braut (1916, Short)
 Die Rache der Toten (1916, Short) as Mayor Paul Horvath
 The Uncanny House (1916, 3 parts) as Albert von Sievers / Franz Mollheim / Professor Cardallhan
 Die Bettlerin von St. Marien (1916) as Buckeljörg
 Unheilbar (1917)
 Der Erbe von 'Het Steen''' (1917)
 A Night of Horror (1917): as the artist's husband
 Das Bacchanal des Todes (1917) as Jan Lars
 Die Kaukasierin (1917)
 Die Fremde (1917) as Pan Hoang Amitaba
 Die Pagode (1917) as Dr. Remus
 Gesühnte Schuld (1917, Short) as Professor Marquardt
 Die Tochter der Gräfin Stachowska (1917) as Adam Kolinski
 The Sea Battle (1917)
 Die schöne Prinzessin von China (1917, Short) as Kaiser
 Wenn Frauen lieben und hassen (1917, Short)
 Der Friedensreiter (1917) as Reiter
 Die schleichende Gefahr (1918) as Musiker
 Let There Be Light (1918) as Waldemar Gorsky
 Der Bettler von Savern (1918)
 Das verwunschene Schloß (1918) as Bauer Grödner
 Der Prozeß Hauers (1918)
 Diary of a Lost Woman (1918) as Meinert
 Madame d'Ora (1918) as Gelehrter Edmund Hall
 Colomba (1918) as Gonzales
 The Story of Dida Ibsen (1918) as Philipp Galen
 Fräulein Pfiffikus (1918)
 Seiner Hoheit Brautfahrt (1918)
 Seelen in Ketten (1918) as the prince
 E, der scharlachrote Buchstabe (1918)
 Das Gift der Medici (1918)
 Der Friedensreiter (1918)
 Opium (1919) as Nung-Tschang
 Prostitution (1919) as Mann
 Mazeppa, der Held der Ukraine (1919) as Mazeppa
 Die Insel der Glücklichen (1919) as Senator Dr. Wenningx
 Rose Bernd (1919) as Bernd
 Das ewige Rätsel (1919) as Faun
 The Dance of Death (1919) as The Cripple
 Phantome des Lebens (1919)
 Die Heimat (1919)
 The Woman with Orchids (1919)
 The Girl and the Men (1919)
 Opfer (1920)
 The Cabinet of Dr. Caligari (1920) as Dr. Caligari
 Spiritismus (1920)
 Eternal River (1920) as a ferryman
 Johannes Goth (1920) as Verleger Assmann
 The Woman Without a Soul (1920) as Stephan Wulkowitz
 Death the Victor (1920) as Dr. Olaf Karsten
 Die Frau im Himmel (1920) as Aufseher
 Der Staatsanwalt (1920) as Ziegelpeter
 The Brothers Karamazov (1920) as Serdjakoff
 The Kwannon of Okadera (1920) as Harlander
 Die Beichte einer Toten (1920)
 Das lachende Grauen (1920)
 The Medium (1921)
 The House in Dragon Street (1921) as Walter
 Christian Wahnschaffe (1921, part 2) as Niels Heinrich
 Danton (1921, dir. Dimitri Buchowetzki) as Robespierre
 Shattered (1921, dir. Lupu Pick) as the track checker
 The Story of Christine von Herre (1921) as  Count Von Herre
 The Dance of Love and Happiness (1921) as Director Mac Sullivan
 Lady Hamilton (1921) as Lord William Hamilton
 Circus of Life (1921) as Philipp Hogger
 Sturmflut des Lebens (1921)
 Fledermäuse (1921)
 Die Beute der Erinnyen (1922) as Wells
 Fridericus Rex (1922-1923, part 1, 3) as Count Kaunitz
 Othello (1922, dir. Dimitri Buchowetzki) as Iago
 The Burning Soil (1922) as  Old Rog
 Luise Millerin (1922) as Secretary Wurm
 The Earl of Essex (1922)
 Nathan the Wise (1922) as Nathan
 Marquise von Pompadour (1922)
 Josef und seine Brüder (1922)
 Die Nacht der Medici (1922)
 The Treasure (1923, dir. G. W. Pabst) as Svetelenz
 Old Heidelberg (1923) as Dr. Jüttner
 The Misanthrope (1923)
 Adam and Eve (1923)
 Between Evening and Morning (1923)
 Fräulein Raffke (1923) as Emil Raffke
 The Merchant of Venice (1923) as Shylock
 The Ancient Law (1923) as Professor Nathan
 The Doll Maker of Kiang-Ning (1923)
 I.N.R.I. (1923) as Pontius Pilatus
 The Unknown Tomorrow (1923) as Marc Muradock
 Decameron Nights (1924) as Soldan
 Waxworks (1924, dir. Paul Leni) as Jack the Ripper / Spring-Heeled Jack
 Une femme dans la nuit (1924)
 Wood Love (1925) as Bottom
 Reveille: The Great Awakening (1925)
 Joyless Street (1925, dir. G. W. Pabst) as Geiringer the butcher
 Jealousy (1925) as Mann/Georges Ménard
 The Morals of the Alley (1925) as a wholesaler
 The Dealer from Amsterdam (1925) as Arent Bergh
 Variety (1925)
 Tartuffe (1925, dir. Friedrich Wilhelm Murnau) as Orgon
 The Woman from Berlin (1925) as Anton Zöllner
 The House of Lies (1926) as Hjalmar Ekdal
 Secrets of a Soul (1926, dir. G. W. Pabst) as Martin Fellman
 Nana (1926, dir. Jean Renoir) as Count Muffat
 The Woman's Crusade (1926) as The Idiot
 Maria, die Geschichte eines Herzens / Das graue Haus (1926) as Vater
 The Student of Prague (1926, dir. Henrik Galeen) as Scapinelli
 Superfluous People (1926) as Constable Suka
 One Does Not Play with Love (1926) as Prince Colalto
 Excluded from the Public (1927) as Ibrahim Hulam
 The Vice of Humanity (1927) as Willibald Cooks
 The Trousers (1927) as Theobald Maske
 Da hält die Welt den Atem an / Maquillage (1927) as Morris Broock
 Radio Magic (1927) as Theophil Schimmelpfenning
 Die Hölle der Jungfrauen (1928) as Mystkowski
 Looping the Loop (1928) as Botto the clown
 The Merry Farmer (1929) as Bauer Mathäus Reuther
 Thou Shalt Not Kill (1929) as Prof. Marquardt
 Napoleon at Saint Helena  (1929) as Napoleon
 Yorck (1931) as General Yorck von Wartenberg
 Man Without a Name (1932) as Heinrich Martin
  (1935) as Napoleon
 Court Theatre (1936, dir. Willi Forst) as Friedrich Mitterer
 Robert Koch (1939, dir. Hans Steinhoff) as Rudolf Virchow
 Der letzte Appell (1939)
 Jud Süß (1940, dir. Veit Harlan) as Rabbi Loew / Secretary Levy / Isaak / Old Jewish Man
 Annelie (1941) as Katasteramtsrat Reinhold Dörensen
 Between Heaven and Earth (1942) as Justus Rottwinkel
 Die Entlassung (1942) as Privy Councillor von Holstein
 Paracelsus (1943, dir. G. W. Pabst) as Paracelsus
 Bonus on Death (1943) as Dr. Schmidt
 The Falling Star (1950) as Lenura / Lenoir
 Son Without a Home (1955) as Wilhelm Hartmann
 Das verräterische Herz'' (1958, TV Short) as the old man (final film role)

References

External links 

 Various pictures of Werner Krauss

1884 births
1959 deaths
20th-century German male actors
Commanders Crosses of the Order of Merit of the Federal Republic of Germany
German male silent film actors
German male stage actors
Iffland-Ring
Academic staff of Leipzig University
People from Coburg (district)
Imperial German Navy personnel of World War I